National Route 162 is a national highway of Japan connecting Shimogyō-ku, Kyoto and Tsuruga, Fukui in Japan, with a total length of 148 km (91.96 mi).

History
Route 162 was designated on 18 May 1953 from Kyoto to Obama. On 1 April 1982 the road was extended to Tsuruga.

References

National highways in Japan
Roads in Fukui Prefecture
Roads in Kyoto Prefecture